Martin Leonard Roberts (born 12 April 1966 in Mullion, Cornwall) is an English former cricketer active from 1983 to 1994 who played for Glamorgan. He appeared in ten first-class matches as a righthanded batsman and wicketkeeper. He scored 100 runs with a highest score of 25 and completed sixteen catches with four stumpings.

Notes

1966 births
Welsh cricketers
Glamorgan cricketers
Living people
Cornwall cricketers